Song Taiping (born December 1955) is a retired Chinese politician who spent his entire career in his home-province Hebei. He was investigated by China's top anti-graft agency in July 2021. Previously he served as vice chairman of the Standing Committee of the Hebei People's Congress.

Career
Song was born in Baixiang County, Hebei, in December 1955. He joined the Baixiang County Fertilizer Plant in March 1975, a year and a half later,
he was transferred to the Publicity Department of CCP Baixiang County Committee and then to the CCP Baixiang County Committee Office in April 1979. He joined the Chinese Communist Party in July 1979. In September 1984, he moved to the CCP Xingtai Committee Office, where he served as deputy director in April 1988. In December 1992, he was appointed magistrate of Ren County, a position he held for five years. He was deputy director of the Organization Department of the CCP Hebei Provincial Committee in December 1997, and held that office until January 2003. Then he served as head of Hebei Provincial Office of Personnel Services before serving as party chief of Zhangjiakou in November 2006. He became party chief of Baoding in January 2008, and served until January 2012, when he was promoted to become vice chairman of the Standing Committee of the Hebei People's Congress. He served in the post until his retirement in January 2018.

Downfall
On 25 July 2021, he has been put under investigation for alleged "serious violations of discipline and laws" by the Central Commission for Discipline Inspection (CCDI), the party's internal disciplinary body, and the National Supervisory Commission, the highest anti-corruption agency of China.

References

1955 births
Living people
People from Baixiang County
Central Party School of the Chinese Communist Party alumni
People's Republic of China politicians from Hebei
Chinese Communist Party politicians from Hebei